The Most Outstanding Offensive Lineman Award is annually awarded to the best offensive lineman in the Canadian Football League. The two nominees for the award are the Leo Dandurand Trophy winner from the East Division, and the DeMarco-Becket Memorial Trophy winner from the West Division. Between the years of 1955 to 1973, both defensive players and offensive lineman had to compete for the CFL's Most Outstanding Lineman Award. By the 1974 season, the league decided to make two separate awards for both defensive players and offensive lineman.

CFL's Most Outstanding Offensive Lineman Award winners

2022 – Stanley Bryant (OT), Winnipeg Blue Bombers
2021 – Stanley Bryant (OT), Winnipeg Blue Bombers
2020 – season cancelled - COVID-19
2019 – Chris Van Zeyl (OT), Hamilton Tiger-Cats
2018 – Stanley Bryant (OT), Winnipeg Blue Bombers
2017 – Stanley Bryant (OT), Winnipeg Blue Bombers
2016 – Derek Dennis (OT), Calgary Stampeders
2015 – SirVincent Rogers (OT), Ottawa RedBlacks
2014 – Brett Jones (C), Calgary Stampeders
2013 – Brendon LaBatte (OG), Saskatchewan Roughriders
2012 – Jovan Olafioye (OT), BC Lions
2011 – Josh Bourke (OT), Montreal Alouettes
2010 – Ben Archibald (OT), Calgary Stampeders 
2009 – Scott Flory (OG), Montreal Alouettes
2008 – Scott Flory (OG), Montreal Alouettes
2007 – Rob Murphy (OT), BC Lions
2006 – Rob Murphy (OT), BC Lions
2005 – Gene Makowsky (OT), Saskatchewan Roughriders
2004 – Gene Makowsky (OT), Saskatchewan Roughriders
2003 – Andrew Greene (OG), Saskatchewan Roughriders 
2002 – Bryan Chiu (C), Montreal Alouettes 
2001 – Dave Mudge (OT), Winnipeg Blue Bombers 
2000 – Pierre Vercheval (OG), Montreal Alouettes 
1999 – Uzooma Okeke (OT), Montreal Alouettes  
1998 – Fred Childress (OG), Calgary Stampeders 

1997 – Mike Kiselak (C), Toronto Argonauts 
1996 – Mike Kiselak (C), Toronto Argonauts 
1995 – Mike Withycombe (OG), Baltimore Stallions 
1994 – Shar Pourdanesh (OT), Baltimore CFLers 
1993 – Chris Walby (OT), Winnipeg Blue Bombers  
1992 – Robert Smith (OT), Ottawa Rough Riders
1991 – Jim Mills (OT), BC Lions 
1990 – Jim Mills (OT), BC Lions
1989 – Rod Connop (C), Edmonton Eskimos 
1988 – Roger Aldag (OG), Saskatchewan Roughriders 
1987 – Chris Walby (OT), Winnipeg Blue Bombers 
1986 – Roger Aldag (OG), Saskatchewan Roughriders
1985 – Nick Bastaja (OT), Winnipeg Blue Bombers
1984 – John Bonk (C), Winnipeg Blue Bombers 
1983 – Rudy Phillips (OG), Ottawa Rough Riders 
1982 – Rudy Phillips (OG), Ottawa Rough Riders 
1981 – Larry Butler (OG), Winnipeg Blue Bombers 
1980 – Mike Wilson (OT), Edmonton Eskimos 
1979 – Mike Wilson (OT), Edmonton Eskimos 
1978 – Jim Coode (OT), Ottawa Rough Riders
1977 – Al Wilson (C), BC Lions 
1976 – Dan Yochum (OT), Montreal Alouettes 
1975 – Charlie Turner (OT), Edmonton Eskimos 
1974 – Ed George (OG), Montreal Alouettes

See also
Leo Dandurand Trophy
DeMarco-Becket Memorial Trophy
CFL's Most Outstanding Lineman Award

References

Canadian Football League trophies and awards